Jamie Carl Thomas (born 10 January 1997), is an English-born Welsh footballer who plays for Bamber Bridge. He has also represented Wales internationally at under-19 level.

Club career
Born in Blackpool, Lancashire, Thomas started his career with local club Blackpool where he spent eight years before transferring to Bolton Wanderers to start his two-year scholarship. In his first year scholar, playing in the under 18 Premier League, Thomas scored 17 goals and in his second year scholar he scored 15 goals. After completing his two-year scholarship, he was rewarded with another one-year extension to his scholarship in May 2015. In April 2016, he was thrown into first-team action featuring as an unused substitute for Championship matches against Cardiff City and Hull City. At the end of the 2015–16 campaign he was released from the club as Bolton were relegated to League One.

Following his release from Bolton, he joined newly promoted Premier League side Burnley on a two-year contract to play for the Development Squad. In July 2016, he was sent out on loan to Scottish Championship side Ayr United on a six-month loan deal, however the loan was cut short in October after Ayr manager Ian McCall deemed that Thomas' game time would be limited. On 11 April 2018, Burnley announced the releasing of the forward to the end of the 2017–18 season.

On 6 October 2018 Thomas signed for Squires Gate. A year later he signed for A.F.C. Blackpool.

On 28 June 2021, he signed for Bamber Bridge. A month later he went on trial with EFL Championship team Preston North End after scoring against them twice for Bamber Bridge in a pre-season friendly. During the trial he scored for Preston in 1–1 pre-season draw against Accrington Stanley. The trial was successful and on 5 August he signed a one year contract with Preston, with Preston having the option to extend it for a further year.

On 25 January 2022, Thomas joined National League side FC Halifax Town on loan for the remainder of the 2021–22 season. 

Thomas was released at the end of the 2021–22 season. 

On 1 November 2022, Thomas returned to Bamber Bridge.

International career
Despite being born in England, Thomas qualifies to represent Wales through his parentage. In August 2014, he received his first call-up to international duty for the under-19 side, for an international friendly double-header against Montenegro. He went on to start the game and scored on his debut in a 3–1 win, and followed it up with another goal in the reverse fixture which Wales won again 2–1. He went on to feature in all of the qualifiers for the 2015 UEFA European Under-19 Championship against Portugal, Denmark and Albania as Wales failed to qualify, scoring twice in six games.

Personal life
In 2018 and 2019, after not playing for 14 months, Thomas suffered from anxiety and depression.

Career statistics

References

External links

Profile at UEFA

1997 births
Living people
Sportspeople from Blackpool
Welsh footballers
Wales youth international footballers
English footballers
English people of Welsh descent
Association football forwards
Bolton Wanderers F.C. players
Burnley F.C. players
Ayr United F.C. players
Squires Gate F.C. players
A.F.C. Blackpool players
Bamber Bridge F.C. players
Preston North End F.C. players
FC Halifax Town players
National League (English football) players
Scottish Professional Football League players